The Saint was an American gay superclub, located in the East Village neighborhood of Manhattan, New York City. It operated from 1980 to 1988.

History 
It opened in the old premises of the Fillmore East, a 1926-built, former-theater-turned-classic-rock-and-roll venue of the late 1960s and early 1970s, at 105 Second Avenue at 6th Street. The Saint was opened by Bruce Mailman and his business partner and his architectural designer, Charles Terrell.

The original opening date was set for July 30, 1980, but construction delays forced a deferral to September 20, 1980, with Alan Dodd as disc jockey.  The nightclub was a success even before it opened.  Membership packs with floor plans were distributed and before the club opened 2,500 memberships had been sold at $150 each for the first 700 members and for $250 for the rest, with a waiting list established.

It was financed in large part by Mailman's other gay venture, the nearby New St. Marks Baths – a gay mecca at the time.  The nightclub's renovation cost $4.5 million, being $2 million over budget ($17 million at 2017 prices).  Money was spent repairing the roof, paying six years of back taxes to the city and fitting out the interior. It opened initially as a private membership gay nightclub (returning the idea of a club to "nightclub"), and set the standard for disco presentation, lighting, sound system, hydraulics and technical support.

However, by the end of its second season, AIDS had begun eating through the fabric of gay life in New York City and began to take a heavy and relentless toll on the Saint's membership.  Change came quickly.  Membership costs were lowered and the season extended into the summer so that the club was open almost all year round. By its seventh season, membership costs had fallen to $50.  It also opened weekly for a straight crowd. Furthermore, by 1985, the Black Party performers were for the first time required to perform safe sex.  By 1987, the performance emphasised masturbation, phone sex and mud wrestling, all a far cry from the club's early days which, on one celebrated occasion, a boa constrictor was used as a prop.

Venue
The Saint was, therefore, technically and creatively one of the best dance clubs of its era. In addition to hiding the speakers, the dome served as a spectacular palette for the lighting effects. A circular opening at the top of the dome could be automatically opened and closed to allow a large mirrored disco ball to be lowered into the space. The speaker cabinets were located on, and attached directly to, the outer surface of the dome, creating a very euphonic "surround sound" effect, the sound system in the club consisted of 500 speakers generating 26,000 watts. In the center of the dance floor was a circular light tree constructed on a hydraulic lift. It contained 1,500 lights and as its centerpiece was a rotating, dual Spitz Space System hemisphere star projector, ten times brighter than those used in planetariums. Mailman had initially approached Zeiss regarding the purchase of a star-projection system, but the company refused to sell one, believing its use in a gay club would be an inappropriate use for their system.

Directly underneath the dance-floor level was a large lounge with several juice bars. Beer on tap was sometimes served for free to avoid the licensing oversight of the New York State Liquor Authority. Above and outside the dome was what would become the controversial balcony, where patrons could see down to the dance floor, through the scrim of the dome.  It was there that men relaxed and, according to the sexual mores of the times, could indulge in sexual activities.  Several times during the year, themed parties such as the "Black Party" and the "White Party" attracted celebrities from around the world. These Saint parties are considered by most disco historians to be the precursors to the circuit party.

DJs
The Saturday night DJs at the nightclub were at the top of their careers: Jim Burgess, Roy Thode, Alan Dodd, Robbie Leslie, Mark Thomas, Terry Sherman, Shaun Buchanan, Michael Fierman, Warren Gluck, Wayne Scott, Chuck Parsons, Michael Cavalone, Nao Nakamura and Sharon White all had their time in the booth. The lighting was operated by Marsha Stern, Richard Tucker, Mark Ackerman, Jorge Villardell, Richard Erskine, Tony DeVizia and Richard Sabala.

Live performances

The nightclub was also known for the quality of its performers.  At showtimes, a part of the dome would retract and stars from the pop music and theater worlds would perform.  The club became the standard against which all New York clubs were measured – many opened, closed and remodelled in the shadow of this giant.  It was renowned for its invitations, design, annual makeovers, and even for its extravagant floral arrangements.

 Patti Austin
 Baltimora
 Claudja Barry
 Celi Bee
 Laura Branigan
 Jocelyn Brown
 Miquel Brown
 Betty Buckley
 Irene Cara
 Cerrone
 Linda Clifford
 Natalie Cole
 Company B
 The Cover Girls
 Tim Curry
 E.G. Daily
 Sarah Dash
 Taylor Dayne
 Dead or Alive
 Hazell Dean
 Kiki Dee
 Teri DeSario
 Divine
 Dominatrix
 Carol Douglas
 Erasure
 Exposé
 The Flirts
 Freeez
 Fun Fun
 Taana Gardner
 Gloria Gaynor
 Debbie Gibson
 Gwen Guthrie
 Sam Harris
 Debbie Harry
 Dan Hartman
 George Hearn
 Nona Hendryx
 Jennifer Holliday
 Loleatta Holloway
 Thelma Houston
 Rhetta Hughes
 Imagination
 Paul Jabara
 Debbie Jacobs
 France Joli
 Grace Jones
 Madleen Kane
 Chaka Khan
 Eartha Kitt
 Rose Laurens
 Amanda Lear
 Paul Lekakis
 Lime
 Dorothy Loudon
 Darlene Love
 Lorna Luft
 Patti LuPone
 Cheryl Lynn
 Kelly Marie
 Nancy Martinez
 Ullanda McCullough
 Maureen McGovern
 Stephanie Mills
 Liliane Montevecchi
 Jackie Moore
 Melba Moore
 Phyllis Nelson
 Noel Pagan
 Paul Parker
 Pepsi & Shirlie
 Pet Shop Boys
 Bonnie Pointer
 Fonda Rae
 Sheryl Lee Ralph
 Red Hot Chili Peppers
 Sharon Redd
 Helen Reddy
 Chita Rivera
 Louise Robey
 Vicki Sue Robinson
 Jimmy Ruffin
 RuPaul
 Seduction
 John Sex
 Shannon
 Dee Dee Sharp
 Marlena Shaw
 Sinitta
 Pamala Stanley
 Brenda K. Starr
 Amii Stewart
 Jermaine Stewart
 Jeff Stryker
 Swing Out Sister
 Sylvester
 Evelyn Thomas
 Tiffany
 Judy Torres
 Tina Turner
 Bonnie Tyler
 Leslie Uggams
 Luther Vandross
 Sarah Vaughan
 Tata Vega
 Shriekback
 Jody Watley
 The Weather Girls
 Deniece Williams
 Viola Wills
 Mary Wilson
 Betty Wright
 Val Young

See also

 LGBT culture in New York City
 List of electronic dance music venues
 List of nightclubs in New York City
Superclub

References

External links
 saintdisco.com – At The Saint; historical site
 Losing Alexandria – 1980s section of a memoir of New York City gay life
 The Music Lives On – fan forum
 Dancing at The Saint – streaming radio of music played at The Saint

1980 establishments in New York City
1980s in LGBT history
1988 disestablishments in New York (state)
Defunct LGBT drinking establishments in New York City
Defunct LGBT nightclubs in New York (state)
East Village, Manhattan
Former music venues in New York City
Music venues completed in 1980
Music venues in Manhattan
Nightclubs in Manhattan
Organizations disestablished in 1988